Arjan Bellaj (born 1 February 1971) is an Albanian former professional footballer who played as a midfielder.

Club career
Bellaj played for PAS Giannina, Kalamata F.C., Apollon Athens F.C., Ethnikos Piraeus F.C. and Panionios F.C. in the Greek Alpha Ethniki.

International career
Bellaj made 31 appearances for the Albania national football team from 1994 to 2001.

Honours
 PAS Giannina
Greek Second Division: 2000
Greek Cup: Semi-Finals 2006–07

References

External links

1971 births
Living people
Footballers from Gjirokastër
Albanian footballers
Albanian emigrants to Greece
Association football midfielders
Albania international footballers
Luftëtari Gjirokastër players
Albanian expatriate footballers
Expatriate footballers in Greece
PAS Giannina F.C. players
Albanian expatriate sportspeople in Greece
Kalamata F.C. players
Apollon Smyrnis F.C. players
Ethnikos Piraeus F.C. players
Panionios F.C. players
A.O. Kerkyra players
Luftëtari Gjirokastër managers
Albanian football managers